The Teylers Coin and Medal Room, or Numismatisch Kabinet, is a small display room in Teylers Museum that was designed in 1888 and furnished with special display cabinets in 1889.

History
In 1884 the expansion of the museum, called "Nieuwe Museum" (New Museum), with the addition of the entrance on the Spaarne river and the new Fossil rooms, had just been completed to commemorate 100 years of exhibits in the Oval Room. At the same time, the small room that had formerly been used for fossils was set up for use by the coin and medal collection. Pieter Teyler's personal coin and medal collection of 1,623 pieces was one of the original parts of the Teyler collection, but the viewing of the coins was only possible when 2 directors of Teylers Stichting were available to unlock the collection. Besides Pieter Teyler's original collection, the Teyler's had acquired collections of 675 coins from West-Friesland and 2,395 coins of Gelderland.

Coin and medal room
List of prominent objects in the coin and medal room: 

In 1888 on the advice of Adriaan Justus Enschedé, a numismatic curator was appointed to oversee the collection, and the first appointment was given to Theodorus Marinus Roest.

References

Further reading 
Teyler 1778-1978. Studies en bijdragen over Teylers Stichting naar aanleiding van het tweede eeuwfeest, Haarlem & Antwerp, 1978.

External links 
 Teylers Museum collection database online (in Dutch)

Teylers Museum
Rijksmonuments in Haarlem
18th-century architecture in the Netherlands